The 2010 MLS SuperDraft was the eleventh annual SuperDraft presented by Major League Soccer. It was held on January 14, 2010 in Philadelphia, Pennsylvania, during the 2010 NSCAA Convention. The 2010 SuperDraft consisted of four rounds with sixteen selections each, for a total of 64 players selected during the draft. The draft preceded the 2010 MLS season.

Philadelphia served as host to the 2010 draft the same year the Philadelphia Union begin play in MLS.  As an expansion team, Philadelphia received the rights to the first selection in each of the four rounds.  As the champion from the 2009 MLS season, Real Salt Lake had the rights to the final selections in each round. As similar in other drafts, teams may trade these rights away to other teams for other rights such as players, special roster spots, or other rights of interest.

Player selection 
Any player whose affiliation is marked with an * is a player who is part of the Generation Adidas group.

Round one

Round one trades

Round two

Round two trades

Round three

Round three trades

Round four

Round four trades

Selections by affiliation

Selections by position

Trade note 
 Los Angeles Galaxy traded the rights to American midfielder/forward Clint Mathis to Real Salt Lake on 2008-08-14. It was reported that LA would receive a conditional fourth-round pick in the 2010 SuperDraft from RSL in exchange. However, RSL kept its fourth-round 2010 selection and instead sent its natural third-round selection in the 2011 MLS SuperDraft to Los Angeles to complete the deal.

2010 Supplemental Draft Trades 
In December 2008 the league decided to cancel the Supplemental Draft, which had typically been held shortly after the annual SuperDraft. Prior to the cancellation a few trades were made involving 2010 Supplemental Draft picks. It is unknown what compensation, if any, clubs trading for 2010 Supplemental Draft picks received in lieu of the draft picks. Announced trades involving 2010 Supplemental Draft selections include:

 Round 4, San Jose Earthquakes → Chicago Fire. 2008-04-04: Chicago Fire acquired a fourth-round selection in the 2010 Supplemental Draft from San Jose Earthquakes in exchange for forward Ryan Johnson. It is likely that Chicago instead received San Jose's fourth-round pick in the 2010 SuperDraft (#51) to fulfill this trade as no trade was announced between the two clubs which involved a fourth-round 2010 SuperDraft pick.
 Round 4, D.C. United → Houston Dynamo. 2008-06-30: Houston Dynamo acquired a fourth-round selection in the 2010 Supplemental Draft from D.C. United in exchange for midfielder Craig Thompson.
 Conditional, Los Angeles Galaxy → San Jose Earthquakes. 2008-11-24: San Jose Earthquakes acquired a conditional selection in the 2010 Supplemental Draft from Los Angeles Galaxy in exchange for forward Jovan Kirovski.

References 

Major League Soccer drafts
SuperDraft
MLS SuperDraft
MLS SuperDraft
Soccer in Pennsylvania
Sports in Philadelphia
Events in Philadelphia
MLS SuperDraft